Park Han-yong (April 13, 1951 – August 27, 2019) was a South Korean businessman who served as President of POSCO.

Biography

Park graduated from Dong-Rae High School and Korea University. He had started off his career at Posco (formerly Pohang Iron and Steel Company) in 1978 and served his entire career in the same company.

Education
 1969 Dong-Rae High School
 1974 Korea University, Statistics bachelor's degree

Career
 1978.05~	Joined Pohang Iron & Steel Co.
 1997~2003	Head of Public Relations department and Hot-roll Purchasing in POSCO
 2003~2004   Director of Hot-roll, Thick Plate and Wire-rod Purchasing in POSCO
 2004~2007	Director of Audit, Material Purchases and Outsourcing in POSCO
 2007~2009	Executive Director of Human Resources in Management Services in POSCO
 2009~	President of POSDATA* 한국공학한림원 정회원 (2008~현재)
 2010~	Director and Vice-President of Management Services of POSCO
 2012~2013	President of POSCO
 2019~ He died on August 27, 2019.

Major roles

Head of Public Relations department and Hot-roll Purchasing in POSCO, The Korea Economic Daily – August 9, 2000.
Director of Hot-roll, Thick Plate and Wire-rod Purchasing in POSCO, The Korea Economic Daily – February 22, 2002.
Director of Audit, Material Purchases and Outsourcing in POSCO, mbn – May 31, 2006.
Executive Director of Human Resources in Management Services in POSCO, EBN Steel News – December 14, 2007.
President of POSCO ICT, The Kyongbuk Ilbo – January 12, 2010.
Director and Vice-President of Management Services of POSCO, NEWSIS – March 10, 2012.
President of POSCO, EBN – March 16, 2012.

References 

South Korean businesspeople
1951 births
2019 deaths
Korea University alumni
POSCO Group people